Sergio Della Sala FRSE, FRSA, FBPsS (born 23/09/1955), trained as Medical Doctor, Clinical Neurologist and Neuropsychologist. He studied at University of Milan, University of Berkeley, MRC in Cambridge (UK).

He held positions in Milan, Perth (Australia), Aberdeen (UK) and as of July 2020 works at the University of Edinburgh as Professor of Human Cognitive Neuroscience. His main field of study is the relationship between brain and behaviour. He is author of over 600 peer-reviewed experimental papers and Editor-in-chief of Cortex.

He is the current President of CICAP (Italian Committee for the Investigation of Claims of the Pseudosciences).

References

External links 

 

1955 births
Place of birth missing (living people)
Fellows of the British Psychological Society
Fellows of the Royal Society of Edinburgh
Academic journal editors
Living people